Lü Wencheng (吕文成, pinyin: Lǚ Wénchéng, or Lui Man Sing in Cantonese) (1898 in Zhongshan - 1981 in Hong Kong) was a Chinese composer and musician. He composed Autumn Moon Over Calm Lake in the 1930s, one of the best known works of Cantonese music.

He also played the yangqin and was a Cantonese opera singer. His music shows a strong influence of the traditional music of the Shanghai area as a result of living almost thirty years there.

Life 
Lü was born in 1898 in Zhongshan, Guangdong Province, but grew up in Shanghai when at the age of three he and his parents moved to Shanghai. There he developed the gaohu, composed and performed Guangdong yinyue, and made recordings. In 1932, he moved to Hong Kong, where he lived until his death in 1981. His daughter, Lü Hong (吕红), is a professional singer, and the wife of Chinese musician Lui Tsun-Yuen.

Works 
Lü is considered to have been a master of Cantonese music (Guangdong yinyue) and Guangdong folk music.

He developed, or co-developed, the gaohu in the 1920s from the erhu by raising its pitch and using steel strings instead of silk, and changing its playing position from on the thigh to between the knees.

He composed Autumn Moon Over the Calm Lake (pinyin: Píng Hú Qiū Yuè) in the 1930s, and this piece remains to this day one of the best known works of Cantonese music.

His piece "Tiger down the Mountain" (pinyin: Xià Shān Hǔ) is quoted in the Chinese Rhapsody by Xian Xinghai.

Compositions

Lü composed over 100 pieces, including:
 bù bù gāo Higher step by step
 chén zuì dōng fēng 沉醉东风 Intoxicated by the easterly wind
 jiāo shí míng qín 蕉石鸣琴
 luò huā tiān 落花天 Flowers falling from sky
 píng hú qiū yuè Autumn Moon Over Calm Lake
 qīng méi zhú mǎ 青梅竹马 Happy childhood
 qí shān fèng 岐山凤 Phoenix of Mount Qishan
 xǐng shī 醒狮 Awakening lion
 yín hé huì 银河会 Meeting in the Milky Way
 yú gē wǎn chàng 渔歌晚唱 Fisherman's song at dusk
 xià shān hǔ 下山虎 Tiger down the Mountain

Audio sample
 Performance of Lü Wencheng's Autumn Moon Over Calm Lake (平湖秋月) by Jiyang Chen
 78 RPM recording of Lü Wencheng's Tiger down the Mountain (下山虎) performed by Lü Wencheng

References

Sources
Du, Yaxiong. Traditional Music Composers, article in Encyclopedia of Contemporary Chinese Culture p. 843, edited by Edward L Davis, Routledge 2005.

External links
 China culture
 See China
 Touristy site, but mentions him
  Biography in Chinese

1898 births
1981 deaths
People's Republic of China composers
Musicians from Guangdong
Republic of China musicians
People from Zhongshan
20th-century composers